Major Charles Ferguson Hoey  VC MC (29 March 1914 – 16 February 1944) was a Canadian recipient of the Victoria Cross, the highest and most prestigious award for gallantry in the face of the enemy that can be awarded to British and Commonwealth forces.

Military career
Charles Ferguson Hoey was born on 29 March 1914, the son of Ferguson and Mary Rudyerd Hoey, of Duncan, Vancouver Island, British Columbia, Canada. Grandson, through his mother, of Major General Charles Rudyerd Simpson CB, Colonel, The Lincolnshire Regiment. He started his education at Queen Margaret's School in Duncan, then attended Duncan Grammar School and Duncan High School.

Hoey went to England in 1933 in order to pursue a military career. He first enlisted in the British Army as a private soldier in the Queen's Own Royal West Kent Regiment, before winning a cadetship to the Royal Military College, Sandhurst and went there in September 1935. He graduated in December 1936 and was commissioned as a second lieutenant in the Lincolnshire Regiment, later the Royal Lincolnshire Regiment, on 28 January 1937. He transferred to the 1st Battalion of the Lincolns, then stationed in India, and sailed for there in September 1937. He went to Burma with the 1st Battalion in 1942 and served there until his death in February 1944. He was awarded the Military Cross (MC) in July 1943 for his outstanding service at Maungdaw during a raid on a Japanese position.

Victoria Cross
He was 29 years old, and a Temporary Major in the 1st Battalion, Lincolnshire Regiment, British Army during the Second World War when the following deed took place during the Battle of Ngakyedauk for which he was awarded the VC.

On 16 February 1944 near the Ngakyedauk Pass, Arakan, Burma (now Myanmar), Major Hoey's company came under devastating machine-gun fire, but Major Hoey did not waver in his advance on the objective. Although wounded in the head and leg he went forward alone with a Bren gun and tackled a troublesome enemy strong point, destroying it and killing all the occupants, but he was mortally wounded.

The citation reads as follows:
"In BURMA, on the 16th February, 1944, Major Hoey's company formed part of a force which was ordered to capture a position at all costs. After a night march through enemy-held territory, the force was met at the foot of the position by machine gun fire. Major Hoey personally led his company under heavy machine gun and rifle fire up to the objective. Although wounded at least twice in the leg and head, he seized a Bren gun from one of his men and, firing from the hip, led his company into the objective. In spite of his wounds the company had difficulty in keeping up with him, and Major Hoey reached the enemy strong post first, where he killed all the occupants before being mortally wounded. Major Hoey's outstanding gallantry and leadership, his total disregard of personal safety and his grim determination to reach the objective resulted in the capture of this vital position." 

His remains are now interred at Taukkyan War Cemetery in Burma.

The medal
His Victoria Cross is displayed in the Galleries of the Royal Lincolnshire Regiment at the Museum of Lincolnshire Life in Lincoln, England.

Charles Hoey VC Memorial Park
Charles Hoey VC Memorial Park has been dedicated in downtown Duncan, B.C. This park is located along Canada Avenue between Trunk Road and Ingram Street. The Cowichan cenotaph, located within the park, is inscribed with the names of area residents killed in the two World Wars and the war in Korea.

See also
Battle of the Admin Box
British VCs of World War 2 (John Laffin, 1997)
Monuments to Courage (David Harvey, 1999)
The Register of the Victoria Cross (This England, 1997)

References

External links
 HOEY, Charles Ferguson
 Biography (in French) of Charles Ferguson Hoey
 Mysteries of Canada Biography 

1914 births
1944 deaths
Royal Lincolnshire Regiment officers
British Army personnel killed in World War II
Canadian World War II recipients of the Victoria Cross
Graduates of the Royal Military College, Sandhurst
Canadian recipients of the Military Cross
People from Duncan, British Columbia
British Army recipients of the Victoria Cross
Burials at Taukkyan War Cemetery
Queen's Own Royal West Kent Regiment soldiers
Canadian military personnel from British Columbia